The 1999 No Mercy held in the United Kingdom was the inaugural No Mercy professional wrestling pay-per-view (PPV) event produced by the American promotion, World Wrestling Federation (WWF, now WWE). It took place on May 16, 1999, at the Manchester Evening News Arena in Manchester, England and was broadcast exclusively for the United Kingdom. It was the only No Mercy held in the United Kingdom, as beginning with the October 1999 event, all further No Mercy events were held in the United States.

During this time, the pay-per-view market was relatively new to Britain, as before 1997, all pay-per-view events were broadcast for free on Sky Sports. UK-exclusive pay-per-views were established as a means to promote this new delivery method, however, the events were booked and treated similarly to house shows.

It was released on DVD in the UK and Europe on July 12, 2010, in a set also including Capital Carnage as part of the WWE's Tagged Classics range released by Silver Vision, without any edits to the original content, most notably keeping all mentions and appearances of the WWF logo intact and un-blurred.

Background
The pay-per-view (PPV) market was relatively new to Britain at the time: before One Night Only in 1997, all pay-per-view events were broadcast for free on Sky Sports. The United Kingdom-exclusive pay-per-views were established to serve as promotion for the new delivery method, however, they were booked and treated similarly to house shows. On May 16, 1999, the World Wrestling Federation (WWF, now WWE) held No Mercy as a UK-exclusive PPV and it was broadcast from the Manchester Evening News Arena in Manchester, England.

Event

Preliminary matches
The first match was a singles match between Tiger Ali Singh and Gillberg. Singh quickly pinned Gillberg after a reverse neckbreaker.

The following match was between The Ministry of Darkness (Viscera, Faarooq and Bradshaw) and The Brood (Gangrel, Edge, and Christian). Bradshaw pinned Gangrel for the victory after a Clothesline From Hell.

The third match saw Steve Blackman defeat Droz by submission using a Triangle Choke. Following that match saw Kane competing against Mideon. Mideon was disqualified after several Corporate Ministry members interfered, resulting in Kane being declared the winner.

The next planned match was between Sable and Tori. Nicole Bass substituted for her and the match ended quickly after Bass performed a Chokeslam on Tori. This would be Sable's last appearance in the WWF for nearly four years.

The sixth event of the night was a WWF European Championship match that saw Shane McMahon defend against X-Pac. McMahon pinned X-Pac after Triple H interfered and gave him a Pedigree, while the referee was down. At one point Pat Patterson and Gerald Brisco stopped Shane McMahon from leaving the match early, leading to Chyna's interference, attacking the pair to prevent further interference.

The seventh match saw Billy Gunn defeat Mankind. Gunn pinned Mankind after a Fameasser.

Main event matches
The main event match was Anything Goes Triple Threat match for the WWF Championship. Defending champion Stone Cold Steve Austin defeated The Undertaker (with Paul Bearer) and Triple H (with Chyna), pinning Triple H after a Stone Cold Stunner following interference from the Corporate Ministry, The Brood, Kane, X-Pac and Mankind.

Aftermath
A second No Mercy event was then held later that same year on October 17, but in Cleveland, Ohio, United States. This second event established No Mercy as the annual October PPV for the promotion until 2008; because of this, the following year's May UK-only pay-per-view was held as Insurrextion. In 2002, the WWF was renamed to World Wrestling Entertainment (WWE). No Mercy was then discontinued and replaced by Hell in a Cell in 2009. It was reinstated in 2016, following the reintroduction of the brand extension, where the promotion divided its roster between the Raw and SmackDown brands where wrestlers were exclusively assigned to perform; the 2016 event was produced exclusively for SmackDown. The 2017 event was then Raw-exclusive, but was the final No Mercy event held, as following WrestleMania 34 in 2018, brand-exclusive PPVs were discontinued, resulting in the promotion reducing the amount of yearly PPVs produced.

Reception
In 2008, J.D. Dunn of 411Mania gave the event a rating of 4.0 [Poor], stating, "The UK events rarely get top effort, and when the 1999 roster dogs it, look the fuck out! There wasn't much that was actively bad outside of Sable walking out (although who cares, really). Most of it was boring and uneventful. If the show never existed -- and in WWF [canon], it barely did – no one would notice.
Thumbs down."

Results

See also

Professional wrestling in the United Kingdom

References

1999 (1)
Professional wrestling in England
Events in Manchester
1999 in England
1999 WWF pay-per-view events
May 1999 events in the United Kingdom
WWE in the United Kingdom
WWE international